The Archiv der Pharmazie (German pronunciation: [ˈ arˈçiːf ˈdeːɐ̯ farmaˈtsiː], English: Archive of Pharmacy) is a monthly peer-reviewed scientific journal covering all aspects of chemistry in the life sciences. The journal was established in 1822 and is published by Wiley-VCH on behalf of the Deutsche Pharmazeutische Gesellschaft. Until 2019, the editor-in-chief was Holger Stark (Heinrich Heine University Düsseldorf). He was succeeded in 2020 by Andreas Link (University of Greifswald).

History
The first edition appeared in 1822 under the name Archiv des Apothekervereins im nördlichen Teutschland für die Pharmacie und ihre Huelfswissenschaften  (English: Archive of the Pharmacists' Association in Northern Germany for Pharmacy and its Auxiliary Sciences). From 1924 (volume 242) the journal was called Archiv der Pharmazie und Berichte der Deutschen Pharmazeutischen Gesellschaft  (English: Archive of Pharmacy and Reports from the German Pharmaceutical Society), before obtaining its current name in 1971.

In 1995 the publication language changed from German to English.

Abstracting and indexing
The journal is abstracted and indexed in:

According to the Journal Citation Reports, the journal has a 2021 impact factor of 4.613.

References

External links

Monthly journals
Wiley-VCH academic journals
Medicinal chemistry journals
Publications established in 1822
Hybrid open access journals
English-language journals